"Mr. and Mrs. Used to Be" is a song written by Billy Joe Deaton that was originally performed by American country music artists Loretta Lynn and Ernest Tubb. It was released as a single in July 1964 via Decca Records.

Background and reception 
"Mr. and Mrs. Used to Be" was recorded at the Columbia Recording Studio on March 10, 1964. Located in Nashville, Tennessee, the session was produced by renowned country music producer Owen Bradley. Three additional tracks were recorded during this session.

"Mr. and Mrs. Used to Be" reached number eleven on the Billboard Hot Country Singles survey in 1964. It was included on their studio album, Mr. & Mrs. Used to Be (1965).

Charts

Weekly charts

Cover Versions 

 1988 - Leon Redbone recorded the song as a duet with Lori Lynn Smith for his album No Regrets.

References 

1964 songs
1964 singles
Decca Records singles
Loretta Lynn songs
Ernest Tubb songs
Song recordings produced by Owen Bradley